Bruce Ellis Benson (born 1960) is a professor of philosophy at Wheaton College in Illinois.

Bibliography

Books written 

Pious Nietzsche: Decadence and Dionysian Faith. Bloomington: Indiana University Press, 2008.

References

External links 
 Wheaton Faculty Bio
 Bruce Ellis Benson website
 SCPT Online - Bio
 Baker Academic - Liturgy as a Way of Life
 Christian Anxiety on Word Press
Review of Pious Nietzsche in "Books and Culture"

Living people
Wheaton College (Illinois) faculty
Wheaton College (Illinois) alumni
KU Leuven alumni
1960 births